The National Sustainable Living Festival is an annual national festival held since 1998 in Melbourne at Federation Square and Birrarung Marr along the Yarra River.

Description 

The month long program includes presentations by local government representatives, environmental and renewable energy groups, experts in climate science and solutions, workshops, demonstrations and discussions about sustainability, and art and music.

External links
Official website

Festivals in Melbourne
Recurring events established in 1998
1998 establishments in Australia
Environmental organisations based in Australia
Intentional living
Simple living
Sustainable design